Christina Lake or Lake Christina can refer to:

Lakes
Christina Lake (British Columbia), in British Columbia, Canada
Christina Lake (Alberta), in Alberta, Canada
Christina Lake (Florida), west of Lakeland Highlands, Florida
Christina Lake (Minnesota), in Douglas and Grant counties, Minnesota

Settlements
Christina Lake, British Columbia, an unincorporated recreational area West Kootenay region of British Columbia, Canada

See also
Christina Lake, character from the Australian soap opera Neighbours
Christina (disambiguation)